The 2018–19 Qatari League, also known as Qatar Stars League, is the 46th edition of top-level football championship in Qatar.

The Qatar Stars League (QSL) has announced the dates of the first phase of the 2018–19 QNB Stars League. The first phase of the QNB Stars League kicked off on 4 August 2018 and ended on 4 November 2018. The league ended on 13 April 2019.

Teams

Stadia and locations

Personnel and Kits

Foreign players
Each clubs are allowed to have nine foreign players. For the remainder of the season, each clubs can include one player from the Asian Football Confederation (AFC) and one player from Union of Arab Football Associations (UAFA).

 Players name in bold indicates the player is registered during the mid-season transfer window.

 Players in italics were out of squad or left club within the season, after pre-season transfer window, or in the mid-season transfer window, and at least had one appearance.

League table

Results

Positions by round

Relegation play-off

Statistics

Top scorers

Hat-tricks

Note
7 Player scored 7 goals

Top assists

Team of the Year

References

External links
 

Qatar Stars League seasons
1
Qatar